Missouri Township may refer to:

 List of townships in Missouri
 Missouri Township, Nevada County, Arkansas, in Nevada County, Arkansas
 Missouri Township, Pike County, Arkansas, in Pike County, Arkansas
 Missouri Township, Brown County, Illinois
 Missouri Township, Boone County, Missouri
 Missouri Township, Burleigh County, North Dakota, in Burleigh County, North Dakota

Township name disambiguation pages